Hernâni Jorge Santos Fortes (born 20 August 1991), known simply as Hernâni, is a Portuguese professional footballer who plays for Rio Ave F.C. as a winger.

He played over 80 Primeira Liga games for Vitória de Guimarães, Porto and Rio Ave, winning a league title with the second of those clubs in 2017–18. Abroad, he won Super League Greece with Olympiacos in 2015–16, and also competed in Spain and Saudi Arabia.

Club career

Early years and Vitória
Born in Lisbon of Cape Verdean descent, Hernâni started playing with local Atlético Clube de Portugal. In the 2010–11 season he contributed 21 appearances – only one start – to help the club return to the Segunda Liga after a lengthy absence, making his debut in the competition on 4 September 2011 by coming on as a 73rd-minute substitute in a 2–1 away win against C.D. Santa Clara.

In January 2013, Hernâni signed a three-and-a-half-year contract with Vitória de Guimarães, being initially assigned to the B team in the second division. His first Primeira Liga appearance occurred on 28 April of that year, when he featured one minute in a 2–2 home draw with F.C. Paços de Ferreira. His first goal in the competition only arrived on 16 August 2014, but he scored a brace in a 3–1 away victory over Gil Vicente FC.

Porto
Hernâni joined FC Porto on the last day of the 2015 January transfer window, after scoring four goals for Vitória in the first half of the campaign. He played his first game precisely against his former side, when he replaced Ricardo Quaresma for the last minutes of the 1–0 home victory on 13 February.

Hernâni moved to Olympiacos F.C. of the Super League Greece on 31 August 2015, in a season-long loan. On 3 April 2016, he netted twice for the second consecutive league match to help to a 4–0 home win over Panthrakikos FC, going on to finish with 26 appearances and eight goals in all competitions.

In the summer of 2016, still owned by Porto, Hernâni returned to Guimarães in a season-long move. He scored 12 times overall during his second spell in the Minho Province, and his goal against C.F. Os Belenenses (1–1 away draw) was also voted the league's best.

Later career
On 2 July 2019, Hernâni signed a three-year deal with Levante UD. He scored his first La Liga goal on 24 September, but in a 3–1 away loss to Real Betis. He repeated the feat the following matchday, but was also sent off for two bookable offences in the 1–1 draw against CA Osasuna at the Estadi Ciutat de València.

Hernâni joined Al Wehda FC of the Saudi Professional League on 13 October 2020, on loan. One year later, he was released by his parent club.

On 27 December 2021, Hernâni agreed to a six-month contract with UD Las Palmas in the Spanish Segunda División. Having played just five games – all off the bench – in his only season in the Canary Islands, he returned to his country's top flight on 9 August at Rio Ave F.C. on a one-year deal with the option of a second. He made his debut 19 days later in a brief cameo in a 3–1 home win over former club and title holders Porto.

Career statistics

Club

Honours
Olympiacos
Super League Greece: 2015–16

Porto
Primeira Liga: 2017–18
Supertaça Cândido de Oliveira: 2018

References

External links

1991 births
Living people
Portuguese people of Cape Verdean descent
Footballers from Lisbon
Portuguese footballers
Association football wingers
Primeira Liga players
Liga Portugal 2 players
Segunda Divisão players
C.D. Cova da Piedade players
Atlético Clube de Portugal players
SC Mirandela players
Vitória S.C. B players
Vitória S.C. players
FC Porto players
FC Porto B players
Rio Ave F.C. players
Super League Greece players
Olympiacos F.C. players
La Liga players
Segunda División players
Levante UD footballers
UD Las Palmas players
Saudi Professional League players
Al-Wehda Club (Mecca) players
Portuguese expatriate footballers
Expatriate footballers in Greece
Expatriate footballers in Spain
Expatriate footballers in Saudi Arabia
Portuguese expatriate sportspeople in Greece
Portuguese expatriate sportspeople in Spain
Portuguese expatriate sportspeople in Saudi Arabia